The Center for Transnational Legal Studies (CTLS) is a global educational center for the study of transnational law.  The Center was founded in London in October 2008 as an initiative by Georgetown University Law Center, providing educational services and student resources. It was constituted as a joint venture between several leading law schools from around the world, each contributing faculty and students to the center.  The Center's founding partner institutions are Georgetown University Law Center, City University of Hong Kong, King's College London,  National University of Singapore, ESADE,  Fribourg University, Hebrew University of Jerusalem, and the University of Torino. The Center also has several affiliate institutions, including Bucerius Law School.

The CTLS facilities are located in London at Bush House, North West Wing, Aldwych, on King's College London's Strand Campus. Students and faculty have access to King's College Law Library amongst other King's College London facilities.

The  Center's curriculum was developed by an Academic Council of faculty from all of the founding law schools and all courses address topics in transnational or comparative law, legal theory or legal practice. designed for students intent on transnational careers.

Academics from the CTLS have also offered public lectures on international legal topics, and in addition to the Center's main academic term program, offers administrative support for the Georgetown Law summer program in London.

References

External links 
 Center for Transnational Legal Studies, Main Website (Hosted by Georgetown University Law Center)
 ESADE law School webpage for the CTLS
 Hebrew University of Jerusalem webpage for the CTLS
 King's College London School of Law webpage for the CTLS
 University of Torino webpage on the CTLS

Legal organisations based in the United Kingdom
Legal research institutes
International college and university associations and consortia
International organisations based in London
Legal education in the United Kingdom